Shosh may refer to:

 Shosh, Albania, a municipality in the Shkodër District, Shkodër County, northwestern Albania
 Shosh, Nagorno-Karabakh (also Shushikend and Shushakend), a village in the disputed region of Nagorno-Karabakh
 Shosh Atari, Israeli actress